Alveolina is an extinct genus of foraminifera with an elliptical or spherical form.

References

Further reading 
 
 

Tubothalamea
Prehistoric Foraminifera genera